Wang Jun (born November 1958) is a Chinese politician and the current head of the State Taxation Administration, in office since March 2013. He was an alternate member of the 18th Central Committee of the Chinese Communist Party and is a member of the 19th Central Committee of the Chinese Communist Party. He was a representative of the 17th, 18th and 19th National Congress of the Chinese Communist Party.

Biography
Wang was born in Shangqiu, Henan, in November 1958. He graduated from Peking University. 

He entered the workforce in July 1976, and joined the Chinese Communist Party in December 1977. In 1987, he was despatched to the Ministry of Finance, becoming a secretary for the then minister Liu Zhongli in 1992. In 1993, he became deputy secretary-general of the Chinese Institute of Certified Public Accountants, but having held the position for only one year. He became the deputy director of the General Office of the Ministry of Finance in 1994, rising to director in July 1998. He rose to become assistant minister in September 2003 and vice minister in October 2005. 

In March 2013, he took office as head of the State Taxation Administration.

Books

References

1958 births
Living people
People from Shangqiu
Peking University alumni
People's Republic of China politicians from Henan
Chinese Communist Party politicians from Henan
Alternate members of the 18th Central Committee of the Chinese Communist Party
Members of the 19th Central Committee of the Chinese Communist Party